Ophryophryne gerti is a species of amphibian in the family Megophryidae.
It is found in Laos and Vietnam. In Vietnam, it is known from the Lang Bian Plateau of Lam Dong Province, and Buon Luoi, Gia Lai Province, and also from Huey Sapan in Laos. Its natural habitats are subtropical or tropical moist lowland forests and rivers. It is threatened by habitat loss.

References

gerti
Amphibians of Laos
Amphibians of Vietnam
Amphibians described in 2003
Taxonomy articles created by Polbot
Taxobox binomials not recognized by IUCN